The Mobile Strike Force Command, or MIKE Force, was a key component of United States Army Special Forces in the Vietnam War. They served with indigenous soldiers selected and trained through the largely minority Civilian Irregular Defense Group (CIDG) and were led by American SF and Australian Army Training Team Vietnam (AATTV) personnel. MIKE Force was a force multiplier, operating what is today called a Foreign Internal Defense mission.

History

United States Army Special Forces had been in South Vietnam since 1957; by 1964, over 1400 Green Berets were in-country, with their headquarters at Nha Trang.  Their primary mission was to train and advise CIDG groups, many of whom were hostile to Viet Cong (VC) efforts to promote socialist revolution in the countryside. 

In late 1964, there was increasing Viet Cong activity in the area surrounding Saigon, a zone officially controlled by the South Vietnamese III Corps; this suggested a need for CIDGs with more mobile capabilities, and able to move to encampments and villages under VC attack. MIke Force was established in summer 1965 as a direct outgrowth of "Eagle Flight" Detachment formed on October 16, 1964 to react to emergency combat situations at Special Forces camps in the western highlands.  The first such force, known as "Mike Force" was named for Special Forces Lieutenant Colonel Miguel de la Pena. It was initially principally composed of Nung people, an ethnic group that had migrated from southern China in the 4th century. Many of the Nùng fighters were ex-French Foreign Legion. The name Mike Force later came to be applied to other locally recruited mobile forces that operated throughout South Vietnam.  These organizations were later composed of Bahnar, Hmong, Nung, Jarai, and Khmer Krom minorities, and other members of the Degar peoples, also known as Montagnards.)

Mike Force's missions were intended as multipurpose reaction units and to act as a country-wide quick reaction force for securing, reinforcing, and recapturing CIDG A Camps, as well as to conduct raids, special reconnaissance patrols. Mike Force also conducted operations gathering intelligence, disrupting/eradicating VC/NVA activities in remote areas, search and destroy missions and bomb damage assessments (BDA). Mike Forces were specifically designed for employment under short reaction time conditions and short duration missions, not prolonged combat engagements. The conventional unit alternative to Special Forces detachments like Mike Force was Tiger Force, which was primarily tasked with counter-guerrilla warfare against enemies from behind their lines that emphasized body-count rather than force multiplication.

Mike Force was active under MACV, 5th Special Forces Group, from 1965 to 1970 and under ARVN until 1974. The unit waged special warfare against the Viet Cong and People's Army of Vietnam (North Vietnamese Army) forces in various detachments. By 1968, each Corps Tactical Zone had a Mike Force assigned including Detachment B-16 Mobile Strike Force under I Corps, Detachment B-20 Mobile Strike Force at Pleiku for II Corps; Detachment B-36 Mobile Strike Force under III Corps; Detachment B-40 Mobile Strike Force under IV Corps and Detachment B-55 Mobile Strike Force based Nha Trang operating under 5th Special Forces Group Headquarters for country wide missions. The command and control of each Mike Force was provided by an A-Team detachment typically composed of two or three officers and 16-18 enlisted Army Special Forces soldiers. Each rifle company was commanded by a senior Special Forces soldier, usually a Master Sergeant or Sergeant First Class and assisted by two or three other SF soldiers including a medic. Mike Forces distinguished themselves at famous battle locations such as Ashau, the Plei Trapp Valley, Nui Giai, Nui Coto, Duc Lap, Nui Khet and others.

Nung people from Mike Force manned Hurricane Aircat airboats in the Mekong Delta under American Special Forces command starting in late 1966. One base was at the A-414 SF camp in Moc Hoa just south of the Cambodian border. There was an accidental incursion into Cambodia on November 20, 1966, involving these airboats, helicopter insertion of South Vietnamese troops and PACVs (hovercraft) that resulted in the deaths of 56 communist soldiers caught by surprise in the open. General Abrams arrived the following day for a debriefing. The King of Cambodia objected a week later.

Mike Force had a critical role in the search and rescue of downed American pilots because they were mobile and often in close proximity to the DMZ. MIKE Force also designated drop zones and landing zones, conducted bomb-damage assessments, called in air strikes on high-value targets, and collected intelligence during recons, much like the American LRRPs.

In 1971 MIKE Force was disbanded after Vietnamization.

See also
 Montagnard
 Kit Carson Scouts
 Vietnamese Rangers
 Civilian Irregular Defense Group program
 Detachment 101
 Project DELTA
 Project GAMMA
 LRRPs
 Operation Phoenix
 MACV
 Tiger Force
 Role of United States in the Vietnam War

References

External links

Save the Montagnard People
Vietnam Studies, U.S. Army Special Forces 1961-1971, CMH Publication 90-23, Department of the Army, Washington, D.C. 1989 (First Printed, 1973)
MIKE Force: An Element of Impact
SF Books-Who's who and known ops
The Special Force by Ed Sprague
MIKE Force Association
"Australian Army Training Team in Viet Nam", MIKE Force Assn.
MIKE Force History

Military units and formations of the United States Army in the Vietnam War
Military of South Vietnam